Astra 1M is a geostationary communications satellite which is operated by SES. It is positioned in geostationary orbit at a longitude of 19.2° East, from where it is used to provide direct to home (DTH) broadcasting to Europe, Africa, and the Middle East.

Satellite description 
Astra 1M was built by Astrium (now Airbus Defence and Space) under a contract signed in July 2005, and is based on the Eurostar 3000S satellite bus. It is equipped with thirty six transponders operating in the J-band of the NATO-defined spectrum, or the Ku-band of the older IEEE-defined spectrum. At the beginning of its operational life, it had a maximum power consumption of 10 kilowatts by the end of the satellite's operational life.

Launch 
The launch of Astra 1M was conducted by International Launch Services (ILS), using a Proton-M launch vehicle with a Briz-M upper stage. The launch occurred from Site 200/39 at the Baikonur Cosmodrome in Kazakhstan, at 20:44:20 UTC on 5 November 2008. Astra 1M was successfully placed into a geostationary transfer orbit (GTO), from which it raised itself to geostationary orbit by means of an onboard apogee motor.

See also 

 2008 in spaceflight
 SES satellite operator
 Astra satellite family

References

External links 
 IMS Official provider's site

Astra satellites
Spacecraft launched in 2008
2008 in Luxembourg
Satellites of Luxembourg
Communications satellites in geostationary orbit
Satellites using the Eurostar bus